In mathematics, the Weeks manifold, sometimes called the Fomenko–Matveev–Weeks manifold, is a closed hyperbolic 3-manifold obtained by (5, 2) and (5, 1) Dehn surgeries on the Whitehead link. It has volume approximately equal to 0.942707… and  showed that it has the smallest  volume of any closed orientable hyperbolic 3-manifold.

Volume
Since the Weeks manifold is an arithmetic hyperbolic 3-manifold, its volume can be computed using its arithmetic data and a formula due to Armand Borel:

 

Alternatively,

 

Related manifolds
The cusped hyperbolic 3-manifold obtained by (5, 1) Dehn surgery on the Whitehead link is the so-called sibling manifold, or sister, of the figure-eight knot complement.  The figure eight knot's complement and its sibling  have the smallest volume of any orientable, cusped hyperbolic 3-manifold.  Thus  the Weeks manifold  can be obtained by hyperbolic Dehn surgery on one of the two smallest orientable cusped hyperbolic 3-manifolds.

See also
Meyerhoff manifold - second small volume

References

.

3-manifolds
Hyperbolic geometry